Itaboravis is an extinct genus of land birds uncovered from the Early Eocene Itaboraí Formation of São José do Itaboraí, Rio de Janeiro state, Brazil. Based on analysis of a coracoid and two humeri it was tentatively assigned to Cariamae (=Cariamiformes), due to similarities with Elaphrocnemus, but some morphological similarities of the humerus to the palaeognathous family Tinamidae were also noted.

References 

Seriemas
Prehistoric bird genera
Eocene birds of South America
Ypresian life
 
Paleogene Brazil
Fossils of Brazil
Fossil taxa described in 2011